Oliver Gordon (born 27 June 1992) is an Australian professional rugby league footballer who most recently played as a prop for Workington Town in the Kingstone Press Championship.

References

External links
Workington Town profile

1992 births
Living people
Rugby league props
Workington Town players